Asahi No.1 Dam  is a gravity dam located in Hokkaido Prefecture in Japan. The dam is used for water supply. The catchment area of the dam is 7.7 km2. The dam impounds about 5  ha of land when full and can store 325 thousand cubic meters of water. The construction of the dam was completed in 1941.

References

Dams in Hokkaido